Miroslav Baumruk (born 12 July 1926) is a Czech basketball player. He competed in the men's tournament at the 1952 Summer Olympics.

References

1926 births
Possibly living people
Czech men's basketball players
Olympic basketball players of Czechoslovakia
Basketball players at the 1952 Summer Olympics
Sportspeople from Prague